Betty and Bettie are common diminutives for the feminine given names Elizabeth and Bethany. 

Betty and Bettie  may also refer to:

Places
 Bettié Department, a department of the Ivory Coast
 Bettié, a town and commune in the Ivory Coast
 Bettie, one of the communities of Down East in the U.S. state of North Carolina
 Bettie, Washington, an unincorporated community in the United States
 Betty, Kentucky, an unincorporated community in the United States
 Mount Betty, a small ridge in the Ross Dependency of Antarctica

Arts and entertainment

Music
 Betty (band), a New York City band
 Betty (Helmet album), 1994
 Betty (Betty Who album), 2019
 "Bettie", a track on the album The Reincarnation of Luna by industrial disco band My Life with the Thrill Kill Kult
 "Betty" (Brooke Fraser song), 2010
 "Betty", a song from the 2002 album Ooh, That Could Cost Him the Gold, Bob! by Chris Cummings
 "Betty" (Taylor Swift song), 2020
 "Betty (Get Money)", a 2022 song by American rapper Yung Gravy, also simply referred to as "Betty"

Other arts and entertainment
 "Betty" (Adventure Time), an episode of the American animated television series, Adventure Time
 Betty (comic strip), a Canadian comic strip
 Betty (film), a 1992 French film by Claude Chabrol
 Betty (musical), a British musical
 Betty (TV series), an American TV series

Military and weaponry
 Betty, the Allied reporting name for Mitsubishi G4M, a Japanese World War II bomber aircraft 
 Betty, the nickname for the American Mark 90 nuclear bomb
 Bouncing Betty, a type of land mine
 , a United States Navy patrol boat in commission from 1917 to 1918
 USS Lady Betty, American ship

Storms
 Hurricane Betty, in the 1972 Atlantic hurricane season
 Tropical Storm Betty (disambiguation), 17 storms or typhoons

Other uses
 Betty (surname), a surname
 Betty lamp, a type of lamp first used in the 18th century

See also
 Bette (disambiguation)
 Betti (disambiguation)